Młynarze  is a village in Maków County, Masovian Voivodeship, in east-central Poland. It is the seat of the gmina (administrative district) called Gmina Młynarze.

The village has a population of 1,950.

References

Villages in Maków County